Killing spinor is a term used in mathematics and physics.  By the more narrow definition, commonly used in mathematics, the term Killing spinor indicates those twistor
spinors which are also eigenspinors of the Dirac operator. The term is named after Wilhelm Killing.

Another equivalent definition is that Killing spinors are the solutions to the Killing equation for a so-called Killing number.

More formally:

A Killing spinor on a  Riemannian spin manifold M is a spinor field  which satisfies

If  then the spinor is called a parallel spinor.

In physics, Killing spinors are used in supergravity and superstring theory, in particular for finding solutions which preserve some supersymmetry.  They are a special kind of spinor field related to Killing vector fields and Killing tensors.

References

Books

External links
"Twistor and Killing spinors in Lorentzian geometry," by Helga Baum (PDF format)
Dirac Operator From MathWorld
Killing's Equation From MathWorld
Killing and Twistor Spinors on Lorentzian Manifolds, (paper by Christoph Bohle) (postscript format) 

Riemannian geometry
Structures on manifolds
Supersymmetry
Spinors